Ygapema plaumanni is a species of beetle in the family Cerambycidae. It was described by Ernst Fuchs in 1966.

References

Clytini
Beetles described in 1966